Coptic-language manuscripts of the New Testament include some of the earliest and most important witnesses for textual criticism of the New Testament. Almost 1000 Coptic manuscripts of the New Testament have survived into the 21st century. The majority of them represent Sahidic and Bohairic dialects; only very few manuscripts represent the dialects of the Middle Egypt.

Sahidic manuscripts 
 The Crosby-Schøyen Codex, Book of Jonah and 1 Peter; the 3rd or 4th centuries; University of Mississippi
 British Library MS. Oriental 7594, Deuteronomy, Jonah, and Acts; the 3rd/4th century
 Michigan MS. Inv 3992, 1 Corinthians, Titus, and the Book of Psalms; 4th century
 Berlin MS. Or. 408, Book of Revelation, 1 John, and Philemon; 4th century
 British Library MS. Oriental 3518 4th century
 Papyrus Bodmer III
 Papyrus Bodmer XIX — Matthew 14:28-28:20; Romans 1:1-2:3; 4th or 5th century.
 Codex Copticus Tischendorfianus I – fragments of the four Gospels; 9th or 10th century

Bohairic manuscripts 
 Papyrus Bodmer III is the oldest manuscript of the Bohairic version
 Huntington MS 17, A, Bohairic-Arabic, dated to 1174, the oldest manuscript with complete text of the four Gospels in Bohairic
 Huntington MS 20, Bohairic-Greek, with complete text of the four Gospels
 Oriental MS 424, Bohairic-Arabic, dated to 1308, with complete text of the Pauline epistles, Catholic epistles, and the Acts
 Oriental MS 425, H2, Bohairic-Arabic
 Oriental MS 426, Bohairic-Arabic
 Oriental MS 1001, E2, Bohairic-Greek, 12th century, British Library
 Oriental MS 1315, E1, Bohairic-Arabic, 1208, British Library
 Oriental MS 1316, H3, Bohairic-Arabic, 1663, British Library
 Oriental MS 1317, Bohairic-Arabic, 1814, British Library
 Oriental MS 3381, 13th century, British Library
 Add MS 5995, D4, Bohairic-Arabic, 14th century, British Library
 Add MS 14470, Bohairic-Arabic, 15th century, British Library
 Codex Marshall Or. 5 - Bohairic-Greek, 14th century, Bodleian Library
 Codex Marshall Or. 6 - Bohairic-Greek, 1320, Bodleian Library
 Codex Marshall Or. 99 - 16th century, Bodleian Library

Other dialects 

Papyrus Michigan 3520 and (6868a), 4-5 century, dialect fayyumic, 1 John, 2 Petrus
 Papyrus Bodmer XLII — 2 Corinthians 10:15-11:12; Sahidic
 Codex Glazier

See also 
 Bible translations into Coptic
 Biblical manuscript
 List of Syriac New Testament manuscripts

Further reading 
 William Aldis Wright, Catalogue of the Syriac manuscripts in the British Museum
 Erwin Nestle, Syrische Übersetzungen
 Caspar René Gregory, Textkritik des Neuen Testaments, (Leipzig 1902), Vol. 2, pp. 507–528.
 Franz-Jürgen Schmitz, Gerd Mink, Liste der koptischen Handschriften des Neuen Testaments (Walter de Gruyter: 1986), Parts 1-2

References

External links 
 Catalogue of the Coptic manuscripts in the British Museum. By W.E. Crum (1905) 
 The Coptic (Sahidic) version of certain Books of the Old Testament: from a papyrus in the British Museum (1908) 
 Franz-Jürgen Schmitz, Gerd Mink, Liste der koptischen Handschriften des neuen Testaments, Walter de Gruyter, 1991, vol. 1, part 2, (pp. 1279) ,  
 Assorted Images of Coptic Manuscripts
 SMR-Datenbank koptischer neutestamentlicher Handschriften des Projektes Novum Testamentum Graecum - Editio Critica Maior der Nordrhein-Westfälischen Akademie der Wissenschaften und der Künste 

Coptic
 
Coptic